Pourquoi viens-tu si tard? (also known as Why Do You Come So Late? or US title: Too Late to Love) is a 1959 French  drama film directed by Henri Decoin who co-wrote screenplay with Pierre Roustang, Albert Valentin and Michel Audiard (dialogue). The films stars Michèle Morgan and Henri Vidal.

It tells the story of an alcoholic female lawyer who help a boy convicted for murder.

External links

1959 films
French drama films
1950s French-language films
Films directed by Henri Decoin
Films with screenplays by Michel Audiard
1950s French films